Yaree Fantini (born 25 November 1997) is an English rugby union player, currently playing for Darlington Mowden Park. His preferred position is flanker. He is Italian qualified.

Fantini signed for Benetton Rugby in January 2022. He made his debut for Benetton in Round 12 of the 2021–22 United Rugby Championship against . He played with Benetton until the end of the season and with Italian team Mogliano in Top10 on loan.

In 2017 Fantini was named in the England Sevens squad.

References

External links
itsrugby.co.uk Profile

1997 births
Living people
English rugby union players
Benetton Rugby players
Rugby union flankers
Mogliano Rugby players
Ayr RFC players